Pope Urban III (r. 1185–1187) created five cardinals in two consistories held during his pontificate.

31 May 1186
 Roberto
 Henry de Sully O.Cist.
 Ugo Geremei
 Gandolfo O.S.B.

1187
 Boson

Notes and references

Sources

College of Cardinals
Urban III
12th-century cardinals
12th-century Catholicism